Tropidonophis negrosensis, the Negros spotted water snake , is a species of colubrid snake. It is found in the Philippines.

References

Tropidonophis
Snakes of Asia
Reptiles of the Philippines
Endemic fauna of the Philippines
Reptiles described in 1917
Taxa named by Edward Harrison Taylor